Bátorove Kosihy  is a village and municipality in the Komárno District in the Nitra Region of south-west Slovakia.

Etymology
The village was named after the Magyar tribe Keszi.

History
It was inhabited by the Avars as shown by an 8th-century cemetery found by archeologists. The village was first recorded in 1156 by its Hungarian name as villa Kesceu. In the 16th century, it became the estate of the Báthory-family, which is reflected by its name.

Until the end of World War I, the village was part of Hungary and fell within the Párkány district of Esztergom. After the Austro-Hungarian army disintegrated in November 1918, Czechoslovak troops occupied the area. After the Treaty of Trianon of 1920, the village became officially part of Czechoslovakia. In November 1938, the First Vienna Award granted the area to Hungary and it was held by Hungary until 1945. After Soviet occupation in 1945, Czechoslovak administration returned and the village became officially part of Czechoslovakia in 1947.

Demography 
In 1910, the village had 3144, for the most part, Hungarian inhabitants. At the 2001 Census the recorded population of the village was 3514 while an end-2008 estimate by the Statistical Office had the village's population also as 3475. As of 2001, 83,38 per cent of its population was Hungarian while 15,59 per cent was Slovak.

Roman Catholicism is the majority religion of the village, its adherents numbering 66.68% of the total population.

Facilities
The village has a public library, a gym and a football pitch. It also has a DVD rental store.

Twinnings
The village is twinned with:
 Bakonyszentlászló, Hungary

References 

Villages and municipalities in the Komárno District
Hungarian communities in Slovakia